"Candidatus Caballeronia verschuerenii" is a bacterium from the genus of Caballeronia and the family Burkholderiaceae.

"Candidatus Caballeronia verschuerenii" is an endosymbiont of the plant Psychotria verschuerenii

References

Burkholderiaceae
Candidatus taxa